WSVV-LP (100.9 FM) is a defunct low-power FM radio station formerly licensed to Center Moriches, New York. The station was silent and its license was set to expire on July 2, 2013, if they did not resume operations. It resumed operations on June 27, 2013.

WSVV-LP again went silent on June 8, 2014. On July 21, 2015, the Federal Communications Commission (FCC) wrote the station to advise that their license was considered expired effective June 9, 2015, due to the station having remained silent for more than twelve months. The station's call sign was deleted from the FCC's database on September 2, 2015.

See also
 LifeTalk Radio — former network affiliation

References

Defunct religious radio stations in the United States
SVV-LP
SVV-LP
Mass media in Suffolk County, New York
Radio stations established in 2005
2005 establishments in New York (state)
Defunct radio stations in the United States
Radio stations disestablished in 2015
2015 disestablishments in New York (state)
SVV-LP